The second Siege of Odawara took place in 1569. Takeda Shingen attacked Odawara Castle, as a response to Hōjō's intervention into Shingen invasion of Suruga Province.

Background
In 1568, as a response to Hōjō clan intervention in Takeda invasion of Suruga Province, Takeda Shingen broke the alliance with the Hōjō, and came into Hōjō territory.

Siege
Shingen came into Musashi Province from his home province of Kai, attacking Takiyama and Hachigata Castles, where Ujiyasu's sons repulsed them.
After failing at the Siege of Takiyama and  Siege of Hachigata (1568), Takeda Shingen nevertheless moved to Sagami Province against the Hōjō clan capital fortress of Odawara in 1569. The siege lasted only three days, after which the Takeda forces burned the town to the ground and left.

Aftermath
Odawara castle itself did not fall and was still held by the Hojo, end of Shingen's campaign at Sagami Province against Hōjō clan.

References

Turnbull, Stephen (1998). 'The Samurai Sourcebook'. London: Cassell & Co.

Odawara 1569
Odawara 1569
1569 in Japan
Conflicts in 1569